Stand Up for Heroes is annual benefit concert/comedy festival, started in 2007, that benefits the Bob Woodruff Foundation, which supports charities and runs programs benefitting veterans. The benefit usually kicks off New York Comedy Festival, and was started by Festival founders Caroline Hirsch and Andrew Fox and Foundation founders Bob Woodruff and Lee Woodruff. The event takes place yearly at the Hulu Theater inside Madison Square Garden, although it was originally held at the Beacon Theatre and The Town Hall, both in New York City. As of 2019, the event has raised $55 million for the foundation.

History 
Bob Woodruff started the annual concert after being seriously wounded in Iraq in 2006, while covering the war on terror and the Iraq War. The concert features a mix of musicians, comedians and other celebrities and entertainers. While the list changes from year, Bruce Springsteen has performed at every event. The concert often features celebrity auctions to raise money for the foundation.

Featured performers 
Over its 13-year run, the concert has featured:

 Jerry Seinfeld
 Jim Gaffigan
 Seth Meyers
 Conan O'Brien
 Robin Williams
 John Oliver
 Stephen Colbert
 Jon Stewart
 Hasan Minhaj
 Sheryl Crow
Mickey Guyton
Tiffany Haddish
Iliza Shlesinger
 Roger Waters

External links 
 Official Site

References 

Benefit concerts
Comedy festivals in the United States
Fundraising events